Šušu Gioro (，pinyin: Shushu Jueluo) was a clan of Manchu nobility belonging to the Gioro Hala   . The other families belonging to the Gioro family were: Aisin Gioro, the ruling clan from 1644 to 1912, Irgen Gioro and Sirin Gioro. The clan descended from Shushu clan dating back to the times of Giocangga. During the reign of Nurhaci, Shushu clan was included into Gioro family. The clan belonged to the Bordered Blue Banner, like another collateral Gioro clansmen. Modern-day descendants sinicized their surnames into Zhao (赵), Shu (舒), Zeng (曾), Gong (贡), Cong (从), Jiang and She.

Males
 Mingde (明德), served as fifth rank literary official (员外郎)

Females
Princess Consort
 Secondary Consort
 Yunti's secondary consort, the mother of Hongchun (1703–1739), Princess (1705–1729), Lady (1706–1761) and Princess (1707–1776)

 Concubine
 Changning's concubine, the mother of Manduhu (1674–1731) and fifth daughter (1677 – 1678 or 1679)

References 

Bordered Blue Banner
Gioro clans